Merocoris typhaeus is a species of leaf-footed bug in the family Coreidae. It is found in the Caribbean Sea and North America.

References

Articles created by Qbugbot
Insects described in 1798
Meropachyinae